Raymond Edward French (January 9, 1895 – April 3, 1978), was a professional baseball player who played shortstop  from 1920 to 1924.

He was later a manager in Minor League Baseball from 1939 to 1941 and an umpire from 1946 to 1950.

External links

1895 births
1978 deaths
Sportspeople from Alameda, California
Major League Baseball shortstops
Brooklyn Robins players
New York Yankees players
Chicago White Sox players
Baseball players from California
Minor league baseball managers
Baker City Miners players
Portland Beavers players
Cedar Rapids Rabbits players
Clear Lake Rabbits players
Vancouver Beavers players
Seattle Rainiers players
Des Moines Boosters players
Vernon Tigers players
Minneapolis Millers (baseball) players
Sacramento Senators players
Oakland Oaks (baseball) players
Kansas City Blues (baseball) players
Louisville Colonels (minor league) players
Ashland Colonels players
Mansfield Braves players